P. S. Vinod is Indian cinematographer who works in Telugu, Hindi and Tamil films. He debuted as an independent cinematographer with the 2000 Tamil film Rhythm and then went to work for several Hindi and Telugu projects.

His notable works include Musafir (2004), My Wife's Murder (2005), Tees Maar Khan (2010), Panjaa (2011), Manam (2014), Soggade Chinni Nayana (2015) Oopiri (2015) and Hello (2017).

Career
He did the majority of the apex commercials in India. He graduated from the Film and Television Institute of Tamil Nadu, now called the MGR Film Institute. After he graduated from the institute, he assisted veteran cinematographer Santosh Sivan. He was then signed by director Vasanth for two of his successive Tamil films, Rhythm and Appu. Subsequently, he did a few well known films in Bollywood. His second Hindi film Musafir got him a Zee Film Awards nomination. His work in Striker (2010) was praised by critics.

He was chosen by choreographer-turned-director Farah Khan to film her third directorial Tees Maar Khan. Vinod's work in the film was lauded by critics, with the film being selected by Rediff as one of the most good looking Bollywood films of 2010. He has worked on two Tamil films, the gangster film Aaranya Kaandam that won The Grand Jury Award for Best Film at South Asian International Film Festival, and the romantic comedy Kadhal 2 Kalyanam. He won the Vijay Award for Best Cinematographer for the former. The latter that marks actor Arya's brother Sathya's debut has been severely delayed and slated to release in 2012.

Filmography

References

External links

Living people
M.G.R. Government Film and Television Training Institute alumni
Filmfare Awards South winners
Cinematographers from Andhra Pradesh
Tamil film cinematographers
Telugu film cinematographers
21st-century Indian photographers
Year of birth missing (living people)